Mercury(II) bromide or mercuric bromide is an inorganic compound with the formula HgBr2. This white solid is a laboratory reagent.  Like all mercury salts, it is highly toxic.

Preparation
Mercury(II) bromide can be produced by reaction of metallic mercury with bromine.

Reactions
Mercury(II) bromide is used as a reagent in the Koenigs–Knorr reaction, which forms glycoside linkages on carbohydrates.

It is also used to test for the presence of arsenic, as recommended by the Pharmacopoeia.
The arsenic in the sample is first converted to arsine gas by treatment with hydrogen. Arsine reacts with mercury(II) bromide:

AsH3 + 3HgBr2 → As(HgBr)3 + 3HBr

The white mercury(II) bromide will turn yellow, brown, or black if arsenic is present in the sample.

Mercury(II) bromide reacts violently with elemental indium at high temperatures
and, when exposed to potassium, can form shock-sensitive explosive mixtures.

References

Mercury(II) compounds
Bromides
Metal halides